Ekta is a 1942 Sindhi film directed by Homi Wadia, produced by Karim Bux Nizamani and Wadia Studios in Bombay. This black and white film was the first film in Sindhi and was financed by Karim Bux Nizamani. It starred Nizamani and Kaushalya in the lead roles and was about Hindu–Muslim unity.

Its premier at the Taj Mahal Cinema in Karachi was inaugurated by the then Premier of Sindh, Allah Bux Soomro, but the film ran in theatres for only two weeks due to trade restrictions incurring significant losses for Wadia.

Production 
This film was directed by Homi Wadia and produced by Ram Panjwani. It was financed by Karim Bux Nizamani who was the hero of this film. Nizamani was not only a film actor, he was also a writer, social worker and a landlord of Matli in Sindh. His autobiography "Kayee" is one of the best autobiographies in Sindhi. Kaushalya was the heroine of the film. She was from Uttar Pradesh, India. She was a dancer, playback singer and actress. Her father Lachhu Maharaj was a famous dancer. He himself trained Kaushalya in Kathak dance. Her mother's name was Rama Devi.

Hari Shivdasani, Chandu Shivdasani, Sikander, Gulshan Sufi, Chander Vaswani, Maya Devi and others played their roles in this film. Noted writer Agha Abdul Nabi Sufi wrote the story and dialogues and famous poet Khialdas Fani composed lyrics for the film. The theme of the film was Hindu Muslim harmony (Ekta means Unity). The film was released in Taj Mahal Cinema Karachi. Kaushalya and Gulshan Sufi were playback singers of this film.

See also
 Sindhi cinema
 List of Sindhi-language films

References

External links
 Ekta at Indiancine.ma
 Ekta at pakmag.net

1942 films
Indian black-and-white films
Sindhi-language films